Satish Chandra Vidyabhusan (30 July 1870 – 25 April 1920) was a Bengali scholar of Sanskrit and Pali Language and principal of Sanskrit College.

Early life
Satish Chandra Vidyabhusan was born in 1870 in Rajbari District, British India. His father Pitambar Vidyavagish was a Pandit and astronomer. In 1888, Satish Chandra passed entrance from Nabadwip Hindu School and in 1892, passed the B.A. with Sanskrit Honours from Krishnagar Government College with gold medal. He was the first Indian who obtained M.A. degree in Pali from Calcutta University.

Career
Vidyabhushan was known for his distinguished knowledge in Indian logic and Tibetan Buddhist Text. He, along with Sarat Chandra Das, prepared Tibetan-English dictionary. Vidyabhusan went to Sri Lanka in 1910 for study and on his return he was appointed the Principal of Sanskrit College, Kolkata. He became the Assistant editor of the Buddhist Text Society. He edited magazine of Bangiya Sahitya Parisad for 22 years. Vidyabhushan was a linguist having knowledge in Buddhist literature, Chinese, Japanese, German and French language. Vidyabhushan has a number of books on Buddhist Tibetan culture, logic, Sanskrit and Systems of Indian Philosophy. In 1906 he received the title of Mahamahopadhyaya. and got Ph. D. in 1908.

References

1870 births
1920 deaths
Bengali writers
Bengali Hindus
20th-century Bengalis
19th-century Bengalis
Bengali philosophers
Writers from Kolkata
Buddhist translators
Tibetan Buddhist spiritual teachers
Religion academics
The Sanskrit College and University alumni
Indian writers
Indian male writers
Indian scholars
Indian translators
Indian academics
Indian editors
Indian magazine editors
Indian essayists
Indian male essayists
Indian non-fiction writers
Indian male non-fiction writers
Indian educators
20th-century Indian philosophers
19th-century Indian philosophers
20th-century Indian writers
19th-century Indian writers
20th-century Indian male writers
19th-century Indian male writers
20th-century Indian scholars
19th-century Indian scholars
20th-century Indian translators
19th-century Indian translators
20th-century Indian essayists
20th-century Indian non-fiction writers
19th-century Indian essayists
19th-century Indian non-fiction writers
Scholars from West Bengal
Educators from West Bengal
West Bengal academics
Indian Sanskrit scholars
Sanskrit scholars from Bengal
University of Calcutta alumni
Academic staff of the University of Calcutta
19th-century translators
20th-century translators
19th-century Indian educators
20th-century Indian educators
Krishnagar Government College alumni